Booker T. Washington State Park may refer to:

 Booker T. Washington State Park (Tennessee)
 Booker T. Washington State Park (West Virginia)
 Booker T. Washington Park (Texas)